Kavain is the main kavalactone found mostly in the roots of the kava plant.

Pharmacology
Kavain has anticonvulsive properties, attenuating vascular smooth muscle contraction through interactions with voltage-dependent  and  channels. How this effect is mediated and to what extent this mechanism is involved in the anxiolytic and analgesic effects of kavalactones on the central nervous system is unknown. The recent finding that kavain can reversibly inhibit both monoamine oxidase A and monoamine oxidase B suggests that kavain may exert some of its effects by modulating serotonin, norepinephrine, and dopamine signaling. 

However, the precise mechanisms underlying the psychotropic, sedative, and anxiolytic actions of kavain and related kavalactones are still debated. Direct binding to the benzodiazepine/flumazenil binding site of the GABA-A receptor does not occur with kavain enantiomers. Many studies involved kava extracts from different plant parts and are, therefore, not applicable to kavain itself. In 2016, kavain was shown to bind at the extrasynaptic α4β2δ GABAA receptor and potentiate GABA efficacy.

A comparative review of in-vivo studies with kavain (and related kavapyrones) to commonly used antiepileptic drugs and mood stabilizers affecting ion fluxes indicates that the kavapyrones are weakly Na+ antagonistic and therefore antiepileptic. They also have pronounced L- type  channel antagonistic properties and act as a positive modulator of the early K+ outward current, which contribute to mood stabilizing properties similar to lamotrigine.

Kavain and analogs remain interesting for drug discovery against a variety of cellular targets, including P-glycoprotein (Pgp), cytochrome P450, and cyclo-oxygenase (COX) enzymes among others.

See also
5,6-dehydrokavain

References

Kavalactones
Ethers
Alkene derivatives
Sedatives
Anxiolytics
GABAA receptor positive allosteric modulators
Norepinephrine reuptake inhibitors
Calcium channel blockers
Sodium channel blockers
Monoamine oxidase inhibitors